MTR Properties and MTR Property Management of the MTR Corporation are responsible for managing apartment buildings it developed, shopping malls at some of its stations, and collaborate with land developers in projects near its stations.  It made over HKD $8,304 million in 2007 from property development. 

It is also a property agent, and provide services on Octopus Access Control System and environmental hygiene service. It operates the following shopping centres: Paradise Mall, Telford Plaza, Maritime Square, Luk Yeung Galleria, The Lane. Two IFC's property management company, Premier Management Services, is a unit of MTRC.

References

External links
MTR Properties
MTR Properties Dubai

MTR Corporation
Land developers of Hong Kong
Property management companies